The ninth season of CSI: Miami premiered on CBS on October 3, 2010 and ended May 8, 2011. The show was on a special time Sunday 8/7c from January 2–16. The series stars David Caruso and Emily Procter.

Description 
Whilst the team reels from Cardoza's murder, Horatio and Calleigh find themselves battling old foes and new criminals. The CSIs investigate murders at a roller-derby, a high school, a human-hunting club, and a college, whilst Natalia finds herself the victim of not one, but two, kidnappings, and Horatio finds himself the victim of a gunshot wound. An explosion at a sugar refinery, a vampire cult, and a visit from a long-dead relative round out the deadly penultimate season of CSI: Miami.

Cast

Main cast 
 David Caruso as Horatio Caine; a CSI Lieutenant and the Director of the MDPD Crime Lab.
 Emily Procter as Calleigh Duquesne; a veteran CSI Detective, the CSI Assistant Supervisor and a ballistics expert.
 Adam Rodriguez as Eric Delko; a CSI Detective and Wolfe's partner.
 Jonathan Togo as Ryan Wolfe; a CSI Detective and Delko's partner.
 Rex Linn as Frank Tripp; a senior Robbery-Homicide Division (RHD) Detective assigned to assist the CSI's.
 Eva LaRue as Natalia Boa Vista; a CSI Detective. 
 Omar Benson Miller as Walter Simmons; an art-theft specialist and CSI Detective.

Recurring cast 
 Christian Clemenson as Tom Loman; the team's Medical Examiner..
 Robert LaSardo as Memmo Fierro; a member of the Mala Noche.

Episodes

References

09
2010 American television seasons
2011 American television seasons